{{DISPLAYTITLE:C6H14N4O2}}
The molecular formula C6H14N4O2 (molar mass: 174.20 g/mol, exact mass: 174.1117 u) may refer to:

 Adipic acid dihydrazide (ADH)
 Arginine (Arg or R)
 Isobutylidenediurea (IBDU)